Poros is a Greek island-pair in the southern part of the Saronic Gulf.

Poros may also refer to:
 Poros stone is named after the islands
 Poros (Attica), a deme of ancient Attica

Any of several villages in Greece:
 Poros, Aetolia-Acarnania, a village of the Nafpaktia municipality 
 Poros, Kefalonia, a village of the Cephalonia municipality
 Poros, Elis, a village of the Andritsaina-Krestena municipality 
 Poros, Evros, a village of the Alexandroupoli municipality 
 Poros, Grevena, a village of the Grevena municipality 
 Poros, Imathia, a village of the Veria municipality 
 Poros, Lefkada, a village of the Lefkada municipality

See also
 Porus (disambiguation)
 City of Poros (ship), a Greek ferry involved in a terrorist attack in 1988